Yelena Gulyayeva, née Rodina (born 14 August 1967 in Moscow) is a retired Russian high jumper. Her personal best jump is 2.01 metres, achieved in May 1998 in Kalamata. She gave a positive drugs test at the 1991 European Cup, and was suspended for two years.

Achievements

See also
List of sportspeople sanctioned for doping offences

External links

1967 births
Living people
Soviet female high jumpers
Russian female high jumpers
Russian sportspeople in doping cases
Athletes (track and field) at the 1996 Summer Olympics
Olympic athletes of Russia
Doping cases in athletics
Athletes from Moscow
European Athletics Championships medalists
Soviet Athletics Championships winners